Herbert Alfred Hill (28 November 1887 – 24 August 1955) was an Australian rules footballer who played with Melbourne and Richmond in the Victorian Football League (VFL).

Notes

External links 

 
Demonwiki profile

1887 births
1955 deaths
Australian rules footballers from Victoria (Australia)
Melbourne Football Club players
Richmond Football Club players